Sea Foam Motel is a historic motel located at Nags Head, Dare County, North Carolina.  It was built in 1948 with additions made through 1964, and is a one- to two-story, Modern style brick building.  It consists of three major sections that form a "U"-shape enclosing a large parking area on three sides.  Also on the property are the contributing swimming pool (1948), playground (c. 1950), and shuffle board court (c. 1950).

It was listed on the National Register of Historic Places in 2004.

References

Hotel buildings on the National Register of Historic Places in North Carolina
Moderne architecture in North Carolina
Hotel buildings completed in 1948
Buildings and structures in Dare County, North Carolina
National Register of Historic Places in Dare County, North Carolina